The Cowichan Valley School District, is located in the Cowichan Valley on Vancouver Island, British Columbia, Canada. It consists of numerous elementary (Kindergarten-Grade 6 or 7), middle (Grade 6–9), Secondary (Grade 8–12) schools, and alternative schools for programs like adult education.

The current Superintendent of the Cowichan Valley School District is Robyn Gray.

History
The current school district can trace its heritage to the Colony of Vancouver Island. Two school districts were established in the area prior to the colony joining mainland British Columbia.

South Cowichan School District was established on June 16, 1869. North Cowichan School District was established a year later on June 16, 1870.

The current School District 79 was formed in 1996 when School District 65 (Cowichan) was combined with School District 66 (Lake Cowichan).

A French Immersion program was established in October 1997, for the 1998–1999 school year. It has grown strong roots and continues to get bigger each year

On July 1, 2012, after refusing to send a balanced budget to the Ministry of Education in British Columbia by June 30, the elected Board of Trustees was dismissed. Current Official Trustee Michael McKay was instated and balanced the budget.

Reconfiguration of the Cowichan Valley school district has been set to commence in the 2013–2014 school year. This marks the change from a middle school model (kindergarten-grade 6, grades 7–9, grades 10–12) to an elementary school system from kindergarten-grade 7 and a secondary school system from grades 8–12. Much deliberation and community input was utilized to implement this new school system.

Schools

See also
List of school districts in British Columbia

External links
Official Website of School District 79

79
Duncan, British Columbia